Bagg or Baggs may refer to:

Places in the United States
 Bagg's Hotel, Utica, New York
 Baggs, Wyoming
 Frederick A. and Sophia Bagg Bonanza Farm, North Dakota

Surname
 Amanda Baggs (born 1980), American blogger
 Arthur Eugene Baggs (1886–1947), American chemist and potter
 Bill Baggs (1921–1969), American journalist and editor
 Edmund Baggs (1865–1949), Australian art teacher and painter
 Richard Baggs (born 1974), English cricketer
 Rob Bagg (born 1985), Canadian football player
 Robert Bagg (born 1935), American poet and translator
 Stanley Clark Bagg (1820–1873), Canadian landowner
 Stevie Baggs (born 1981), American football player

See also
 
 
 Bag (disambiguation)
 Baggio (disambiguation)